Mark Elliot Zuckerberg (born ) is an American business magnate, internet entrepreneur, and philanthropist. He is known for co-founding the social media website Facebook and its parent company Meta Platforms (formerly Facebook, Inc.), of which he is executive chairman, chief executive officer, and controlling shareholder.

Zuckerberg attended Harvard University, where he launched Facebook in February 2004 with his roommates Eduardo Saverin, Andrew McCollum, Dustin Moskovitz, and Chris Hughes. Originally launched to select college campuses, the site expanded rapidly and eventually beyond colleges, reaching one billion users by 2012. Zuckerberg took the company public in May 2012 with majority shares. In 2007, at age 23, he became the world's youngest self-made billionaire. He has used his funds to organize multiple philanthropic endeavors, including the Chan Zuckerberg Initiative.

Since 2008, Time magazine has named Zuckerberg among the 100 most influential people in the world as a part of its Person of the Year award, which he was recognized with in 2010. In December 2016, Zuckerberg was ranked tenth on Forbes list of The World's Most Powerful People. In the Forbes 400 list of wealthiest Americans in 2022 he was ranked 11th with a wealth of $57.7 billion, down from his status as the third richest American in 2021 with a net worth of $134.5 billion. As of March 2023, Zuckerberg's net worth was $64.9 billion according to the Forbes Real Time Billionaires making him the 16th richest person in the world. A film depicting Zuckerberg's career, The Social Network, was released in 2010.

Zuckerberg's prominence in the technology industry has prompted political and legal attention. The founding of Facebook involved Zuckerberg in multiple lawsuits regarding the creation and ownership of the website. In 2013, he co-founded the pro-immigration lobbying group FWD.us. On April 10 and 11, 2018, Zuckerberg testified before the United States Senate Committee on Commerce, Science, and Transportation regarding the usage of personal data by Facebook in relation to the Facebook–Cambridge Analytica data breach.

Early life
Mark Elliot Zuckerberg was born in White Plains, New York, on May 14, 1984, the son of psychiatrist Karen and dentist Edward Zuckerberg. He and his three sisters (Arielle, businesswoman Randi, and writer Donna) were raised in a Reform Jewish household in Dobbs Ferry, New York. His great-grandparents were Jewish emigrants from Austria, Germany, and Poland. He attended high school at Ardsley High School before transferring to Phillips Exeter Academy. He was captain of the fencing team.

Software development

Early years 
Zuckerberg began using computers and writing software in middle school. In high school, he built a program that allowed all the computers between his house and his father's dental office to communicate with each other. During Zuckerberg's high-school years, he worked to build a music player called the Synapse Media Player. The device used machine learning to learn the user's listening habits, which was posted to Slashdot and received a rating of 3 out of 5 from PC Magazine. A New Yorker profile said of Zuckerberg: "some kids played computer games. Mark created them."

College years 
The New Yorker noted that by the time Zuckerberg began classes at Harvard in 2002, he had already achieved a "reputation as a programming prodigy". He studied psychology and computer science and belonged to Alpha Epsilon Pi and Kirkland House. In his sophomore year, he wrote a program that he called CourseMatch, which allowed users to make class selection decisions based on the choices of other students and also to help them form study groups. A short time later, he created a different program he initially called Facemash that let students select the best-looking person from a choice of photos. Arie Hasit, Zuckerberg's roommate at the time, explained:

We had books called Face Books, which included the names and pictures of everyone who lived in the student dorms. At first, he built a site and placed two pictures or pictures of two males and two females. Visitors to the site had to choose who was "hotter" and according to the votes there would be a ranking.

The site went up over a weekend, but by Monday morning, the college shut it down, because its popularity had overwhelmed one of Harvard's network switches and prevented students from accessing the Internet. In addition, many students complained that their photos were being used without permission. Zuckerberg apologized publicly, and the student paper ran articles stating that his site was "completely improper".

Career

Facebook 

The following semester, in January 2004, Zuckerberg began writing code for a new website. On February 4, 2004, Zuckerberg launched "Thefacebook", originally located at thefacebook.com, in partnership with his roommates Eduardo Saverin, Andrew McCollum, Dustin Moskovitz, and Chris Hughes. An earlier inspiration for Facebook may have come from Phillips Exeter Academy, the prep school from which Zuckerberg graduated in 2002. It published its own student directory, "The Photo Address Book", which students referred to as "The Facebook". Such photo directories were an important part of the student social experience at many private schools. With them, students were able to list attributes such as their class years, their friends, and their telephone numbers.

Six days after the site launched, three Harvard seniors, Cameron Winklevoss, Tyler Winklevoss, and Divya Narendra, accused Zuckerberg of intentionally misleading them into believing he would help them build a social network called HarvardConnection.com, while he was instead using their ideas to build a competing product. The three complained to The Harvard Crimson, and the newspaper began an investigation in response. While Zuckerberg tried to convince the editors not to run the story, Zuckerberg broke into two of the editors' email accounts. He did it based on the editors' private login data logs from TheFacebook.

Following the official launch of the Facebook social media platform, the three filed a lawsuit against Zuckerberg that resulted in a settlement. The agreed settlement was for 1.2 million Facebook shares and $20 million in cash.

Zuckerberg's Facebook started off as just a "Harvard thing" until Zuckerberg decided to spread it to other schools, enlisting the help of roommate Dustin Moskovitz. They began with Columbia, New York University, Stanford, Dartmouth, Cornell, University of Pennsylvania, Brown, and Yale.

Zuckerberg dropped out of Harvard in his sophomore year in order to complete the project. Zuckerberg, Moskovitz and the other co-founders moved to Palo Alto, California, where they leased a small house that served as an office. Over the summer, Zuckerberg met Peter Thiel, who invested in the company. They got their first office in mid-2004. According to Zuckerberg, the group planned to return to Harvard, but they eventually decided to remain in California, where Zuckerberg appreciated the "mythical place" of Silicon Valley, the center of computer technology in California. They had already turned down offers by major corporations to buy the company. In an interview in 2007, Zuckerberg explained his reasoning: "It's not because of the amount of money. For me and my colleagues, the most important thing is that we create an open information flow for people. Having media corporations owned by conglomerates is just not an attractive idea to me." The same year, speaking at Y Combinator's Startup School course at Stanford University, Zuckerberg made a controversial assertion that "young people are just smarter" and that other entrepreneurs should bias towards hiring young people.

He restated these goals to Wired magazine in 2010: "The thing I really care about is the mission, making the world open." Earlier, in April 2009, Zuckerberg sought the advice of former Netscape CFO Peter Currie about financing strategies for Facebook. On July 21, 2010, Zuckerberg reported that the company reached the 500-million-user mark. When asked whether Facebook could earn more income from advertising as a result of its phenomenal growth, he explained:

I guess we could ... If you look at how much of our page is taken up with ads compared to the average search query. The average for us is a little less than 10 percent of the pages and the average for search is about 20 percent taken up with ads ... That's the simplest thing we could do. But we aren't like that. We make enough money. Right, I mean, we are keeping things running; we are growing at the rate we want to.

In 2010, Steven Levy, who wrote the 1984 book Hackers: Heroes of the Computer Revolution, wrote that Zuckerberg "clearly thinks of himself as a hacker". Zuckerberg said that "it's OK to break things" "to make them better". Facebook instituted "hackathons" held every six to eight weeks where participants would have one night to conceive of and complete a project. The company provided music, food, and beer at the hackathons, and many Facebook staff members, including Zuckerberg, regularly attended. "The idea is that you can build something really good in a night", Zuckerberg told Levy. "And that's part of the personality of Facebook now ... It's definitely very core to my personality."

In 2007, Zuckerberg was added to MIT Technology Review's TR35 list as one of the top 35 innovators in the world under the age of 35. Vanity Fair magazine named Zuckerberg number 1 on its 2010 list of the Top 100 "most influential people of the Information Age". Zuckerberg ranked number 23 on the Vanity Fair 100 list in 2009. In 2010, Zuckerberg was chosen as number 16 in New Statesmans annual survey of the world's 50 most influential figures.

In a 2011 interview with PBS shortly after the death of Steve Jobs, Zuckerberg said that Jobs had advised him on how to create a management team at Facebook that was "focused on building as high quality and good things as you are".

On October 1, 2012, Zuckerberg visited Russian Prime Minister Dmitry Medvedev in Moscow to stimulate social media innovation in Russia and to boost Facebook's position in the Russian market. Russia's communications minister tweeted that Prime Minister Dmitry Medvedev urged the social media giant's founder to abandon plans to lure away Russian programmers and instead consider opening a research center in Moscow. In 2012, Facebook had roughly 9 million users in Russia, while domestic clone VK had around 34 million. Rebecca Van Dyck, Facebook's head of consumer marketing, said that 85 million American Facebook users were exposed to the first day of the Home promotional campaign on April 6, 2013.

On August 19, 2013, The Washington Post reported that Zuckerberg's Facebook profile was hacked by an unemployed web developer.

At the 2013 TechCrunch Disrupt conference, held in September, Zuckerberg stated that he is working towards registering the 5 billion people who were not connected to the Internet as of the conference on Facebook. Zuckerberg then explained that this is intertwined with the aim of the Internet.org project, whereby Facebook, with the support of other technology companies, seeks to increase the number of people connected to the internet.

Zuckerberg was the keynote speaker at the 2014 Mobile World Congress (MWC), held in Barcelona, Spain, in March 2014, which was attended by 75,000 delegates. Various media sources highlighted the connection between Facebook's focus on mobile technology and Zuckerberg's speech, stating that mobile represents the future of the company. Zuckerberg's speech expands upon the goal that he raised at the TechCrunch conference in September 2013, whereby he is working towards expanding Internet coverage into developing countries.

Alongside other American technology figures like Jeff Bezos and Tim Cook, Zuckerberg hosted visiting Chinese politician Lu Wei, known as the "Internet czar" for his influence in the enforcement of China's online policy, at Facebook's headquarters on December 8, 2014. The meeting occurred after Zuckerberg participated in a Q&A session at Tsinghua University in Beijing, China, on October 23, 2014, where he conversed in Mandarin Chinese; although Facebook is banned in China, Zuckerberg is highly regarded among the people and was at the university to help fuel the nation's burgeoning entrepreneur sector.

Zuckerberg fielded questions during a live Q&A session at the company's headquarters in Menlo Park on December 11, 2014. The founder and CEO explained that he does not believe Facebook is a waste of time, because it facilitates social engagement, and participating in a public session was so that he could "learn how to better serve the community".

Zuckerberg receives a one-dollar salary as CEO of Facebook. In June 2016, Business Insider named Zuckerberg one of the "Top 10 Business Visionaries Creating Value for the World" along with Elon Musk and Sal Khan, due to the fact that he and his wife "pledged to give away 99% of their wealth—which was then estimated at $55.0 billion."

On May 25, 2017, at Harvard's 366th commencement Day, Zuckerberg, after giving a commencement speech, received an honorary degree from Harvard.

In January 2019, Zuckerberg laid plans to integrate an end-to-end encrypted system for three major social media platforms, including Facebook, Instagram and WhatsApp. On August 14, 2020, Facebook integrated the chat systems for Instagram and Messenger on both iOS and Android devices. The update encouraged cross-communication between Instagram and Facebook users.

Other projects

A month after Zuckerberg launched Facebook in February 2004, i2hub, another campus-only service, created by Wayne Chang, was launched. i2hub focused on peer-to-peer file sharing. At the time, both i2hub and Facebook were gaining the attention of the press and growing rapidly in users and publicity. In August 2004, Zuckerberg, Andrew McCollum, Adam D'Angelo, and Sean Parker launched a competing peer-to-peer file sharing service called Wirehog, a precursor to Facebook Platform applications, which launched in 2007.

In 2013, Zuckerberg launched Internet.org, which he described as an initiative to provide Internet access to the five billion people without it as of the launch date. The project faced significant opposition in India, where activists said its limited internet ran counter to the principle of net neutrality; Zuckerberg responded that a limited internet was better than no internet. Internet.org was shut down in India in February 2016, although Zuckerberg later met with Narendra Modi to discuss further possibilities.

Zuckerberg is a board member of the solar sail spacecraft development project Breakthrough Starshot, which he co-founded in 2016.

Controversies and lawsuits

ConnectU lawsuits 

Harvard students Cameron Winklevoss, Tyler Winklevoss, and Divya Narendra accused Zuckerberg of intentionally making them believe he would help them build a social network called HarvardConnection.com (later called ConnectU). They filed a lawsuit in 2004; it was dismissed on a technicality on March 28, 2007. It was refiled soon thereafter in federal court in Boston. Facebook countersued in regards to Social Butterfly, a project put out by The Winklevoss Chang Group, an alleged partnership between ConnectU and i2hub. On June 25, 2008, the case settled and Facebook agreed to transfer over 1.2 million common shares and pay $20 million in cash.

In November 2007, confidential court documents were posted on the website of 02138, a magazine that catered to Harvard alumni. They included Zuckerberg's Social Security number, his parents' home address, and his girlfriend's address. Facebook filed to have the documents removed; the judge ruled in favor of 02138.

Eduardo Saverin 

In 2005, Facebook co-founder Eduardo Saverin filed a lawsuit against Zuckerberg and Facebook, alleging that Zuckerberg had illegally spent Saverin's money on personal expenses. The lawsuit was settled out of court, though terms of the settlement were sealed, the company affirmed Saverin's title as co-founder of Facebook, and Saverin agreed to stop talking to the press.

Pakistan criminal investigation 
In June 2010, Pakistani Deputy Attorney General Muhammad Azhar Sidiqque launched a criminal investigation into Zuckerberg and Facebook co-founders Dustin Moskovitz and Chris Hughes after a "Draw Muhammad" contest was hosted on Facebook. The investigation named the anonymous German woman who created the contest. Sidiqque asked the country's police to contact Interpol to have Zuckerberg and the three others arrested for blasphemy. On May 19, 2010, Facebook's website was temporarily blocked in Pakistan until Facebook removed the contest from its website at the end of May. Sidiqque also asked its UN representative to raise the issue with the United Nations General Assembly.

Paul Ceglia 

In June 2010, Paul Ceglia, the owner of a wood pellet fuel company in Allegany County, upstate New York, filed suit against Zuckerberg, claiming 84 percent ownership of Facebook and seeking monetary damages. According to Ceglia, he and Zuckerberg signed a contract on April 28, 2003, that an initial fee of $1,000 entitled Ceglia to 50% of the website's revenue, as well as an additional 1% interest in the business per day after January 1, 2004, until website completion. Zuckerberg was developing other projects at the time, among which was Facemash, the predecessor of Facebook, but did not register the domain name thefacebook.com until January 1, 2004. Facebook management dismissed the lawsuit as "completely frivolous". Facebook spokesman Barry Schnitt told a reporter that Ceglia's counsel had unsuccessfully sought an out-of-court settlement.

On October 26, 2012, federal authorities arrested Ceglia, charging him with mail and wire fraud and of "tampering with, destroying and fabricating evidence in a scheme to defraud the Facebook founder of billions of dollars." Ceglia is accused of fabricating emails to make it appear that he and Zuckerberg discussed details about an early version of Facebook, although after examining their emails, investigators found there was no mention of Facebook in them. Some law firms withdrew from the case before it was initiated and others after Ceglia's arrest.

Hawaiian land ownership 
In January 2017, Zuckerberg filed eight "quiet title and partition" lawsuits against hundreds of native Hawaiians to claim small tracts of land which they own. This land is contained within the 700 acres of land in the Hawaiian island of Kauai that Zuckerberg had purchased in 2014. University of Hawaii law professor Kapua Sproat stated that Zuckerberg's lawsuits was "the face of neocolonialism". Zuckerberg responded to criticisms in a Facebook post, stating that the lawsuits were a good faith effort to pay the partial owners of the land their "fair share". When he learned that Hawaiian land ownership law differs from that of the other 49 states, he dropped the lawsuits. Zuckerberg stated that he regretted not taking the time to understand the process and its history before moving ahead.

Testimony before U.S. Congress
On April 10 and 11, 2018, Zuckerberg testified before the United States Senate Committee on Commerce, Science, and Transportation regarding the usage of personal data by Facebook in relation to the Facebook–Cambridge Analytica data breach. He has called the whole affair a breach of trust between Aleksandr Kogan, Cambridge Analytica, and Facebook. Zuckerberg has refused requests to appear to give evidence on the matter to a Parliamentary committee in the United Kingdom.

On October 1, 2020, the US Senate Commerce Committee unanimously voted to issue subpoenas to the CEOs of three top tech firms, including Zuckerberg, Google’s Sundar Pichai and Twitter's Jack Dorsey. The subpoenas aimed to force the CEOs to testify about the legal immunity the law affords tech platforms under Section 230 of the Communications Act of 1934. US Republicans argued that the law unduly protected social media companies against allegations of anti-conservative censorship.

In March 2021, it was announced that Zuckerberg would testify before Congress again on March 26, when he will be questioned about the role that Facebook played in the January 6, 2021 attack on the US Capitol Building.

Depictions in media

The Social Network

A movie based on Zuckerberg and the founding years of Facebook, The Social Network was released on October 1, 2010, starring Jesse Eisenberg as Zuckerberg. After Zuckerberg was told about the film, he responded, "I just wished that nobody made a movie of me while I was still alive." Also, after the film's script was leaked on the Internet and it was apparent that the film would not portray Zuckerberg in a wholly positive light, he stated that he wanted to establish himself as a "good guy". The film is based on the book The Accidental Billionaires by Ben Mezrich, which the book's publicist once described as "big juicy fun" rather than "reportage". The film's screenwriter Aaron Sorkin told New York magazine, "I don't want my fidelity to be the truth; I want it to be storytelling", adding, "What is the big deal about accuracy purely for accuracy's sake, and can we not have the true be the enemy of the good?"

Upon winning the Golden Globe Award for Best Picture on January 16, 2011, producer Scott Rudin thanked Facebook and Zuckerberg "for his willingness to allow us to use his life and work as a metaphor through which to tell a story about communication and the way we relate to each other." Sorkin, who won for Best Screenplay, retracted some of the impressions given in his script:
I wanted to say to Mark Zuckerberg tonight, if you're watching, Rooney Mara's character makes a prediction at the beginning of the movie. She was wrong. You turned out to be a great entrepreneur, a visionary, and an incredible altruist.

On January 29, 2011, Zuckerberg made a surprise guest appearance on Saturday Night Live, which was hosted by Jesse Eisenberg. They both said it was the first time they had met. Eisenberg asked Zuckerberg, who had been critical of his portrayal by the film, what he thought of the movie. Zuckerberg replied, "It was interesting." In a subsequent interview about their meeting, Eisenberg explained that he was "nervous to meet him, because I had spent now, a year and a half thinking about him ..." He added, "Mark has been so gracious about something that's really so uncomfortable ... The fact that he would do SNL and make fun of the situation is so sweet and so generous. It's the best possible way to handle something that, I think, could otherwise be very uncomfortable."

Disputed accuracy
According to David Kirkpatrick, former technology editor at Fortune magazine and author of The Facebook Effect: The Inside Story of the Company That Is Connecting the World, (2011), "the film is only "40% true ... he is not snide and sarcastic in a cruel way, the way Zuckerberg is played in the movie." He says that "a lot of the factual incidents are accurate, but many are distorted and the overall impression is false", and concludes that primarily "his motivations were to try and come up with a new way to share information on the Internet".

Although the film portrayed Zuckerberg's creation of Facebook in order to elevate his stature after not getting into any of the elite final clubs at Harvard, Zuckerberg said he had no interest in joining the clubs. Kirkpatrick agreed that the impression implied by the film is "false". Karel Baloun, a former senior engineer at Facebook, noted that the "image of Zuckerberg as a socially inept nerd is overstated ... It is fiction ..." He likewise dismissed the film's assertion that he "would deliberately betray a friend."

Other depictions
Zuckerberg voiced himself on an episode of The Simpsons titled "Loan-a Lisa", which first aired on October 3, 2010. In the episode, Lisa Simpson and her friend Nelson encounter Zuckerberg at an entrepreneurs' convention. Zuckerberg tells Lisa that she does not need to graduate from college to be wildly successful, referencing Bill Gates and Richard Branson as examples.

On October 9, 2010, Saturday Night Live lampooned Zuckerberg and Facebook. Andy Samberg played Zuckerberg. The real Zuckerberg was reported to have been amused: "I thought this was funny."

Stephen Colbert awarded a "Medal of Fear" to Zuckerberg at the Rally to Restore Sanity and/or Fear on October 30, 2010, "because he values his privacy much more than he values yours".

Zuckerberg appears in the climax of the documentary film Terms and Conditions May Apply.

Zuckerberg was parodied in the South Park episode "Franchise Prequel".

On December 7, 2018, Epic Rap Battles of History released a rap battle video between Zuckerberg and Elon Musk.

Philanthropy and Chan Zuckerberg Initiative

Zuckerberg founded the Start-up: Education foundation. On September 22, 2010, it was reported that Zuckerberg had donated $100 million to Newark Public Schools, the public school system of Newark, New Jersey. Critics noted the timing of the donation as being close to the release of The Social Network, which painted a somewhat negative portrait of Zuckerberg. Zuckerberg responded to the criticism, saying, "The thing that I was most sensitive about with the movie timing was, I didn't want the press about The Social Network movie to get conflated with the Newark project. I was thinking about doing this anonymously just so that the two things could be kept separate." Newark Mayor Cory Booker stated that he and New Jersey Governor Chris Christie had to convince Zuckerberg's team not to make the donation anonymously. The money was largely wasted, according to journalist Dale Russakoff.

In 2010, Zuckerberg, Bill Gates, and investor Warren Buffett signed "The Giving Pledge", in which they said they would donate to charity at least half of their wealth over the course of time, and invited others among the wealthy to donate 50 percent or more of their wealth to charity. In December 2012, Zuckerberg and his wife Priscilla Chan said that over the course of their lives they would give the majority of their wealth to "advancing human potential and promoting equality" in the spirit of The Giving Pledge.

On December 19, 2013, Zuckerberg announced a donation of 18 million Facebook shares to the Silicon Valley Community Foundation, to be executed by the end of the month—based on Facebook's valuation as of then, the shares totaled $990 million in value. On December 31, 2013, the donation was recognized as the largest charitable gift on public record for 2013. The Chronicle of Philanthropy placed Zuckerberg and his wife at the top of the magazine's annual list of 50 most generous Americans for 2013, having donated roughly $1 billion to charity.

In October 2014, Zuckerberg and Chan donated US$25 million to combat the Ebola virus disease, specifically the West African Ebola virus epidemic.

On December 1, 2015, Zuckerberg and Chan pledged to transfer 99% of their Facebook shares, then valued at US$45 billion, to the Chan Zuckerberg Initiative. The funds would not be transferred immediately, but over the course of their lives. Instead of forming a charitable corporation to donate the value of the stock to, as Bill Gates, Warren Buffett, Larry Page, Sergey Brin and other billionaires have done, Zuckerberg and Chan chose to use the structure of a limited liability company (LLC). Some journalists and academics have said the Chan Zuckerberg Initiative conducts philanthrocapitalism.

In 2016, the Chan Zuckerberg Initiative gave $600 million to create the tax-exempt charity Chan Zuckerberg Biohub, a collaborative research space in San Francisco's Mission Bay District near the University of California, San Francisco, with the intent to foster interaction and collaboration between scientists at UCSF, University of California, Berkeley, and Stanford University. Intellectual property generated would be jointly owned by Biohub and the discoverer's home institution. Unlike foundations like the Bill and Melinda Gates Foundation which open up all research funded to unrestricted access and reuse by the public, Biohub retained the right to commercialize any research it funds. Inventors will have the option of making their discoveries open-source, with permission from Biohub. To increase access to scientific research and promote open science, CZ Biohub requires its investigators and staff scientists to publish submitted manuscripts and related data on preprints servers like bioRxiv.

Amidst the COVID-19 pandemic, Zuckerberg donated $25 million to a Bill and Melinda Gates Foundation-backed accelerator that is searching for treatments for the disease. He also announced $25 million in grants to support local journalism that was impacted by the pandemic and $75 million in advertisement purchases in local newspapers by Facebook, Inc., where Facebook would market itself.

Politics

In 2002, Zuckerberg registered to vote in Westchester County, New York, where he grew up, but did not cast a ballot until November 2008. Santa Clara County Registrar of Voters Spokeswoman, Elma Rosas, told Bloomberg that Zuckerberg is listed as "no preference" on voter rolls, and he voted in at least two of the past three general elections, in 2008 and 2012.

Zuckerberg has never revealed his own political affiliation or voting history: some news outlets consider him to be a conservative, while others consider him liberal.

On February 13, 2013, Zuckerberg hosted his first ever fundraising event for New Jersey Governor Chris Christie. Zuckerberg's particular interest on this occasion was education reform, and Christie's education reform work focused on teachers unions and the expansion of charter schools. Later that year, Zuckerberg hosted a campaign fundraiser for Newark mayor Cory Booker, who was running in the 2013 New Jersey special Senate election. In September 2010, with the support of Governor Chris Christie, Booker obtained a US$100 million pledge from Zuckerberg to Newark Public Schools. In December 2012, Zuckerberg donated 18 million shares to the Silicon Valley Community Foundation, a community organization that includes education in its list of grant-making areas.

On April 11, 2013, Zuckerberg led the launch of a 501(c)(4) lobbying group called FWD.us. The founders and contributors to the group were primarily Silicon Valley entrepreneurs and investors, and its president was Joe Green, a close friend of Zuckerberg. The goals of the group include immigration reform, improving the state of education in the United States, and enabling more technological breakthroughs that benefit the public, yet it has also been criticized for financing ads advocating a variety of oil and gas development initiatives, including drilling in the Arctic National Wildlife Refuge and the Keystone XL pipeline. In 2013, numerous liberal and progressive groups, such as The League of Conservation Voters, MoveOn.org, the Sierra Club, Democracy for America, CREDO, Daily Kos, 350.org, and Presente and Progressives United agreed to either pull their Facebook ad buys or not buy Facebook ads for at least two weeks, in protest of Zuckerberg ads funded by FWD.us that were in support of oil drilling and the Keystone XL pipeline, and in opposition to Obamacare among Republican United States senators who back immigration reform.

A media report on June 20, 2013, revealed that Zuckerberg actively engaged with Facebook users on his own profile page after the online publication of a FWD.us video. In response to a claim that the FWD.us organization is "just about tech wanting to hire more people", the Internet entrepreneur replied: "The bigger problem we're trying to address is ensuring the 11 million undocumented folks living in this country now and similar folks in the future are treated fairly."

In June 2013, Zuckerberg joined Facebook employees in a company float as part of the annual San Francisco Lesbian, Gay, Bisexual, and Transgender Pride Celebration. The company first participated in the event in 2011, with 70 employees, and this number increased to 700 for the 2013 march. The 2013 pride celebration was especially significant, as it followed a U.S. Supreme Court ruling that deemed the Defense of Marriage Act (DOMA) unconstitutional.

When questioned about the mid-2013 PRISM scandal at the TechCrunch Disrupt conference in September 2013, Zuckerberg stated that the U.S. government "blew it". He further explained that the government performed poorly in regard to the protection of the freedoms of its citizens, the economy, and companies.

Zuckerberg placed a statement on his Facebook wall on December 9, 2015, which said that he wants "to add my voice in support of Muslims in our community and around the world" in response to the aftermath of the November 2015 Paris attacks and the 2015 San Bernardino attack. The statement also said that Muslims are "always welcome" on Facebook, and that his position was a result of the fact that "as a Jew, my parents taught me that we must stand up against attacks on all communities."

On February 24, 2016, Zuckerberg sent out a company-wide internal memo to employees formally rebuking employees who had crossed out handwritten "Black Lives Matter" phrases on the company walls and had written "All Lives Matter" in their place. Facebook allows employees to free-write thoughts and phrases on company walls. The memo was then leaked by several employees. As Zuckerberg had previously condemned this practice at previous company meetings, and other similar requests had been issued by other leaders at Facebook, Zuckerberg wrote in the memo that he would now consider this overwriting practice not only disrespectful, but "malicious as well." According to Zuckerberg's memo, "Black Lives Matter doesn't mean other lives don't – it's simply asking that the black community also achieves the justice they deserve." The memo also noted that the act of crossing something out in itself, "means silencing speech, or that one person's speech is more important than another's." Zuckerberg also said in the memo that he would be launching investigations into the incidents. New York's Daily News interviewed Facebook employees who commented anonymously that, "Zuckerberg was genuinely angry about the incident and it really encouraged staff that Zuckerberg showed a clear understanding of why the phrase 'Black Lives Matter' must exist, as well as why writing through it is a form of harassment and erasure."

In January 2017, Zuckerberg criticized Donald Trump's executive order to severely limit immigrants and refugees from some countries.

Zuckerberg funded a state-level ballot initiative for the 2020 general election that would raise taxes by altering California's Proposition 13 to require the tax assessment of commercial and industrial properties in the state at market rate.

Personal life
Zuckerberg met his future wife, fellow Harvard student Priscilla Chan, at a frat party during his sophomore year there. They began dating in 2003. In September 2010, Chan, who was by then a medical student at the University of California, San Francisco, moved into Zuckerberg's rented house in Palo Alto, California. On May 19, 2012, they married in the grounds of his mansion in an event that also celebrated her graduation from medical school. On July 31, 2015, Zuckerberg revealed that they were expecting a baby girl and that Chan had previously experienced three miscarriages. Their daughter, Maxima Chan Zuckerberg, was born on December 1, 2015. They announced in a Chinese New Year video that their daughter's Chinese name is Chen Mingyu. Their second daughter, August, was born in August 2017. In September 2022, Zuckerberg announced that he and Chan were expecting their third daughter, due in 2023. The couple also have a Puli dog named Beast, who has over two million followers on Facebook.

Raised as a Reform Jew, Zuckerberg later identified as an atheist, but in 2016 said, "I was raised Jewish and then I went through a period where I questioned things, but now I believe religion is very important."

In 2017, Zuckerberg and his wife began a nationwide tour "to visit every state in the union and learn more about a sliver of the nearly two billion people who regularly use the social network". He met with farmers and business owners, and spoke at Mother Emanuel, where a shooting took place in 2015.

In an August 2022 appearance on The Joe Rogan Experience, Zuckerberg said one of his biggest regrets was competing on the fencing team in high school instead of wrestling. Motherboard implicitly criticized this by comparing it to another potential regret: Facebook's "enabling genocide in Myanmar because it did not bother to hire moderators who speak Burmese", an incident for which Zuckerberg apologized at the time. In the same interview, he also said he regretted that Facebook had throttled posts about the Hunter Biden laptop controversy.

In 2022, Zuckerburg took up training in both Mixed Martial Arts and Brazilian Jiu-Jitsu. Since then, he has been open about his love for the two sports.

See also 
 Criticism of Facebook
 Mark Zuckerberg book club

References

External links

 
 
 Mark Zuckerberg – Forbes
 
 "Zuckerberg's Love Affair With Xi Jinping" – Forbes

1984 births
Living people
21st-century American businesspeople
21st-century philanthropists
American billionaires
American chairpersons of corporations
American computer businesspeople
American computer programmers
American Internet celebrities
American technology chief executives
American technology company founders
Businesspeople from New York (state)
Businesspeople from the San Francisco Bay Area
Directors of Meta Platforms
Facebook employees
Former atheists and agnostics
Giving Pledgers
Jewish American philanthropists
Life extensionists
Nerd culture
People from Dobbs Ferry, New York
People from Palo Alto, California
People from White Plains, New York
Phillips Exeter Academy alumni
Time Person of the Year
World Economic Forum Young Global Leaders
Mark
Centibillionaires